Castanopsis kawakamii is a species of plant in the family Fagaceae. It is found in China, Taiwan, and Vietnam. It is threatened by habitat loss.

References

kawakamii
Near threatened plants
Trees of China
Trees of Taiwan
Trees of Vietnam
Taxonomy articles created by Polbot
Taxa named by Bunzō Hayata